Stenocercus marmoratus is a species of lizard of the Tropiduridae family. It is found in Bolivia and Argentina.

References

Stenocercus
Reptiles described in 1837
Reptiles of Bolivia
Reptiles of Argentina
Taxa named by André Marie Constant Duméril
Taxa named by Gabriel Bibron